Alafia River State Park is a Florida State Park, located near Picnic in Hillsborough County in central Florida, 17 miles southeast of Tampa on County Road 39. Even before it became a park, the area, and particularly Hurrah Lake, was the center of leisure activities since the early 1880s.

History
Phosphate mining began in the area in the 19th century. At its peak the Lonesome Mine was owned by American Cyanamid and then its subsidiary Brewster Phosphates, who excavated the area with draglines until it was no longer commercially profitable to do so. In 1993, Brewster Phosphates including the Lonesome Mine was transferred from American Cyanamid to Cytec Industries. In 1996, Cytec donated the land to the state to be used as a park in perpetuity. Some of the topographical changes caused by mining have been reclaimed, but others, including the features known as the Old Agrico Pits, persist. Some of these were shaped into small lakes during reclamation efforts by Brewster Phosphates under the state's failed Old Lands Program.

Recreational activities
The park has such amenities as bicycling, birding, canoeing, fishing, hiking, horse trails, picnicking areas, wildlife viewing and full camping facilities. Especially known for its mountain biking, it has trails ranging from beginning to advanced, with the advanced ones being in an area of the park that was once a phosphorus strip mine. The mountain bike trails were originally created and maintained by the SouthWest Association of Mountain Bike Pedalers (SWAMP) club, but are now maintained by the Friends of Alafia club. The forest has grown back. The mine was abandoned before remediation laws took effect, and the area where mountain biking exists is an erratic mixture of pond depressions and abrupt hills jutting from the surface.

Mountain Biking 
Alafia State Park is home to 17 miles of bike trails that range from novice to highly advanced sections. The trails are rated Epic by the International Mountain Bicycling Association (IMBA). The trailhead parking lot consists of bathrooms, bicycle rinsing stations, shaded pavilions, a volleyball net and a playground. Alafia Trails are maintained and kept in safe conditions by the Friends of Alafia on a regular basis. The trails are solely preserved by volunteers so that park staff can focus on resource management tasks and other maintenance. Alafia State Park regularly posts on Instagram of updates and maintenance happening to the trails. Alafia also hosts a Mountain Biking Skills Clinic that is designed to enhance a riders capability on the trails.

Gallery

References

External links
 Alafia River State Park at Florida State Parks
 Alafia River Watershed

State parks of Florida
Parks in Hillsborough County, Florida
Mountain biking venues in the United States